"Sonny" Zhou Bin (born 1983 in Shanghai) is a Chinese model.

She is fluent in English and several Chinese dialects. Zhou has worked on campaigns for Aveda, Dooney & Bourke, Electrolux, L'Oréal, Nordstrom, Revlon, and Shanghai Tang. Her runway credits include Christian Dior, Givenchy, Just Cavalli, Viktor & Rolf, Lacoste, Baby Phat, L.A.M.B. by Gwen Stefani, Lacoste, and Vera Wang.

She is signed to IMG Models (New York City, Milan).

References

External links

Official website

1983 births
Living people
Chinese female models
People from Shanghai